Deakin Hall may refer to:

Deakin Hall (politician)
Deakin Hall, a residence hall at Monash University, Clayton campus.